La Morra is a comune (municipality) in the Province of Cuneo in the Italian region Piedmont, located about  southeast of Turin and about  northeast of Cuneo.

The municipality of La Morra contains the frazioni (subdivisions, mainly villages and hamlets) Annunziata, Santa Maria, Rivalta, and Berri.

La Morra borders the following municipalities: Alba, Barolo, Bra, Castiglione Falletto, Cherasco, Narzole, Roddi, and Verduno.

History 
La Morra originated as Murra (Latin: "sheep fencing"), a village built in the Roman era by the nearby town of Alba Pompeia. In 1631 it became a possession of the House of Savoy.

Long a major wine growing region, it was illegal in La Morra to cut down a Nebbiolo vine. The penalties for this offense ranged from a fine, to having a hand amputated to hanging.

References

External links 
 La Morra Tourist Office

Cities and towns in Piedmont
Hilltowns in Piedmont